"Living It Up" is a 1993 music single by Stakka Bo from the 1993 album Supermarket.

The song peaked at #38 on the Swedish chart.

Music video 
The music video has a water theme and is set in a white space with Stakka Bo and Oskar Franzén performing. UNICEF Goodwill Ambassador Roger Moore appears in the video saying "Children in Nepal need fresh water. You can help."

References

1993 singles
1993 songs
Works by Johan Renck